Rineloricaria setepovos is a species of catfish in the family Loricariidae. It is native to South America, where it occurs in the Piratini River, which is part of the Uruguay River basin, in the state of Rio Grande do Sul in Brazil. The species reaches 10.6 cm (4.2 inches) in standard length and is believed to be a facultative air-breather.

References 

Loricariini
Fish described in 2008
Catfish of South America
Freshwater fish of Brazil